Bade Sola  is a village in Chanditala I community development block of Srirampore subdivision in Hooghly district in the Indian state of West Bengal.

Geography

Gram panchayat
Villages in Haripur gram panchayat are: Anantarampur, Bade Sola, Baghati, Ban Panchbere, Chak Bangla, Chota Choughara, Dudhkomra, Haripur, Ichhapasar, Jagmohanpur, Mamudpur and Radhaballabhpur.

Demographics
As per 2011 Census of India, Bade Sola had a total population of 2,094 of which 1,093 (52%) were males and 1,001 (48%) were females. Population below 6 years was 192. The total number of literates in Bade Sola was 1,571 (82.60% of the population over 6 years).

References 

Villages in Chanditala I CD Block